Magdala is an English early music group founded by David Skinner (musicologist).

Discography
 "A Gift for a King: a Florentine offering to Henry VIII," Latin motets. Magdala. Skinner The Gift of Music (record label)
 "Magnificat" - motets by Clemens Fayrfax Layolle Lhéritier Mantova Richafort Sheppard, Magdala, David Skinner

References

Early music groups